is a Japanese business executive and the current president of Toyota Motor Corporation. He is a great-grandson of the industrialist, Sakichi Toyoda, and a grandson of both the founder of Toyota Motors, Kiichiro Toyoda, and the founder of the Takashimaya department stores corporation, Shinshichi Iida.

On 1 April 2023, Toyoda will step down as Toyota president and become chairman of the board.

Early life and education
Toyoda is the great-grandson of the Toyoda Automatic Loom Works founder Sakichi Toyoda, and grandson of Toyota Motor Corporation founder Kiichiro Toyoda. He was born 3 May 1956, in Nagoya, to Shoichiro Toyoda and Hiroko (née Mitsui). Toyoda's family line have long dominated the upper management of the family businesses since the days his carpenter-farmer great-great-grandfather, Ikichi Toyoda, taught his son fabrication and carpentry. Akio Toyoda was the chief contender for the family business when Katsuaki Watanabe was reassigned as Vice-Chairman in the wake of the quality control crisis.

Toyoda completed his undergraduate work in law at Keio University in Japan and was awarded his Masters of Finance at Babson College in Massachusetts. He would join the family business in 1984.

Career at Toyota

As grandson of the company's founder, Toyoda joined Toyota's board of directors in 2000. In 2005, Toyoda was promoted to the position of executive vice president. In January 2009, it was announced that Toyoda was chosen as the forthcoming president of the company. On 23 June 2009, he was confirmed as the new president, along with four new executive vice presidents and eight new board members. The previous president and CEO Katsuaki Watanabe became vice chairman, replacing Katsuhiro Nakagawa.

In 2012, he was named Autocar's Man of the Year.

Master driver "Morizo"
As an avid auto racing fan and driver himself, Toyoda has promoted sports models including the Lexus IS F and Lexus LFA at auto races. He has participated as a driver at events including the 2009 24 Hours Nürburgring race employing the pseudonym Morizo Kinoshita. In 2009, he reached the 87th position overall and the fourth position in his class with his LF-A Prototype No. 14.

In 2016, Toyoda approved the project that would result in the GR Yaris; during the development of that car, Toyoda (as Morizo) served as a test driver. Morizo crashed the first test car during a mid-winter test drive at a Hokkaido track; after exiting the car on his own, he remarked that he did not "like the feel of it". As Morizo, Toyoda continued to drive development prototypes, and since the car's release, has campaigned the car in races.

Toyota global recalls and Congressional Statement

In the wake of massive global recalls ballooning to 8.5 million vehicles, Toyoda was invited to testify before the U.S. Congress on 17 February 2010, which he accepted. A week later, he issued a prepared statement to the Congress. He focused on three key issues: Toyota's basic philosophy regarding quality control, the cause of the recalls, and "how we will manage quality control going forward". On 24 February 2010, accompanied by president and COO of Toyota Motor North America, Yoshimi Inaba, Toyoda testified before the House of Representatives' Oversight and Government Reform Committee. As the scion of a family known for their contributions to automated manufacturing, Toyoda was personally affected by the quality control crises. In his comments he is quoted as being "deeply sorry" and highlighted the relations between Toyota vehicles in the United States and Americans for fifty years.

Future direction of Toyota
At a press event held on December 14, 2021, where Toyota unveiled multiple concept cars with battery electric drivetrains, Toyoda was asked how he felt about BEVs, given the company's prior emphasis on emissions reduction and elimination through hybrid and hydrogen vehicles. Toyoda responded both as chair and master driver: "Of course I supported BEVs in terms of business, but the question was whether I was supporting them as driver Morizo. ... I think we are now at a point where we can develop safer and faster vehicles with more fun-to-drive aspects. I look forward to developing such BEVs as well moving forward."

Family tree

Notes

References
 Hasegawa, Yōzō. (2010). Rediscovering Japanese Business Leadership: 15 Japanese Managers and the Companies They're Leading to New Growth. Hoboken, New Jersey: Wiley. ; OCLC 435422498

1957 births
Living people
People from Nagoya
Babson College alumni
Chief executives in the automobile industry
Japanese chief executives
Keio University alumni
Toyota people
Akio
Japanese racing drivers
Officiers of the Légion d'honneur
Toyota Gazoo Racing drivers
Nürburgring 24 Hours drivers
Presidents of the Japan Automobile Manufacturers Association